Big & Rich's Super Galactic Fan Pak 2 is the second EP and DVD set released by the American country music duo Big & Rich. The compilation, released in late 2008, is a follow-up to their 2004 EP/DVD combo Big & Rich's Super Galactic Fan Pak. This set is composed of a three-song CD and a live DVD featuring a full-length concert.

Big Kenny later included "Find a Heart" as "To Find a Heart" on his 2009 solo album The Quiet Times of a Rock and Roll Farm Boy.

Track listing

EP

DVD (Live)

Chart performance

References

External links
Big & Rich Super Galactic Fan Pak 2

2008 EPs
Big & Rich albums
Albums produced by Paul Worley
Albums produced by John Rich
2008 video albums
Warner Records video albums
Warner Records EPs